Sir Chaloner Ogle, 1st Baronet (1726 – 27 August 1816) was an officer of the Royal Navy. He served during the Seven Years' War, American War of Independence, and the French Revolutionary and Napoleonic Wars.

Life
He was the son of Nathaniel Ogle of Kirkley Hall, Northumberland. As a naval officer he was commissioned a lieutenant on 19 November 1745 and then promoted to captain on 30 June 1756. He took a number of valuable prizes during his cruises, and received a knighthood in 1768. From 1770 he commanded the 74-gun  during the Falklands Crisis, and then the 74-gun  from 1774. He served under Admiral Sir George Rodney at the relief of Gibraltar in January 1780, the action of 8 January 1780 and the Battle of Cape St. Vincent. He was promoted to Rear-Admiral of the Blue on 26 September 1780, Vice-Admiral of the Blue on 24 September 1787, Vice-Admiral of the Red on 1 February 1793, Admiral of the Blue on 12 April 1794 and Admiral of the Red in 1805.

In 1773 he acquired the Manor of Kings Worthy, Hampshire and on 12 March 1816 was created 1st Baronet of Worthy in the Baronetage of the United Kingdom.

Family
His sister Isabella married his cousin and namesake Admiral Sir Chaloner Ogle. Ogle himself married Hester Thomas, daughter of John Thomas, Bishop of Winchester, in 1761. (His brother Newton married her sister.) He was succeeded in the Baronetcy by his son, Charles.

Portraits
Confusion has arisen over another portrait, held at the National Maritime Museum at Greenwich, but this is now known to be a flag officer, previously thought to be Sir Chaloner Ogle. Another portrait of Sir Chaloner Ogle of Worthy by a follower of Joshua Reynolds was sold at Christie's auction house in 2009, which bears the same likeness to the painting in the National Maritime Museum.

Notes

References

Naval archives 
Soton Library
Portsmouth Maritime Museum
Christie's Auction house
British Library, London.

Ogle, Chaloner
Ogle, Chalonor
1726 births
1816 deaths
Royal Navy personnel of the Seven Years' War
Royal Navy personnel of the American Revolutionary War
Royal Navy personnel of the French Revolutionary Wars
Royal Navy personnel of the Napoleonic Wars